Ibrahima Fall Faye (born 10 January 1997) is a Senegalese professional basketball player for Metropolitans 92 of the LNB Pro A and the Senegal national basketball team.

Professional career
Fall Faye played in the youth teams of Élan Chalon. He played 9 matches in the LNB Pro A with during the 2016–17 season., as well as three matches in the FIBA Europe Cup and one in the 2017 Leaders Cup.

In April 2018, he declared for the 2018 NBA draft.

On July 7, 2019, Fall Faye signed a two-year contract with Telenet Giants Antwerp.

On February 27, 2021, Fall Faye has signed with AS Monaco of the French LNB Pro A.

On July 24, 2022, he has signed with Metropolitans 92 of the LNB Pro A.

National team career
Fall Faye has been a member of the Senegal national basketball team. He played at the 2019 FIBA Basketball World Cup.

References

1997 births
Living people
2019 FIBA Basketball World Cup players
Antwerp Giants players
AS Monaco Basket players
Centers (basketball)
Élan Chalon players
Leuven Bears players
Metropolitans 92 players
People from Thiès Region
Poitiers Basket 86 players
Power forwards (basketball)
Senegalese expatriate basketball people in Belgium
Senegalese expatriate basketball people in France
Senegalese men's basketball players